Dafni, part of the municipal unit of Tsotyli, is a small town located in the far west of the Kozani regional unit, itself in the Greek region of Macedonia.

References

Populated places in Kozani (regional unit)